Beryl May Jessie Toye,  (1 May 1917 – 27 February 2010), known professionally as Wendy Toye, was a British dancer, stage and film director and actress.

Life and career
Toye was born in London. She initially worked as a dancer and choreographer both on stage and on film. She joined the Markova-Dolin Ballet Company as a soloist and was taken under the wing of Dame Ninette de Valois. She was soon collaborating with the likes of directors Jean Cocteau and Carol Reed. She first appeared on film as a dancer in Anthony Asquith’s film Dance Pretty Lady in 1931. In 1936 she was working on the opera film Pagliacci with the director Karl Grune, who, caught up in technical matters, asked Toye to direct the actors for him. 

Toye directed the original production of the musical Bless the Bride in 1947. Her debut film short as a director, The Stranger Left No Card (1952), won the Best Fictional Short Film prize at the 1953 Cannes Film Festival, while her Christmas-themed short On the Twelfth Day… (1955) received an Oscar nomination in the Best Short Subject category. She directed films from the early 1950s until the early 1980s. Toye also was an advisor to the Arts Council and lectured in Australia.

She was attacked and robbed in her maisonette in Westminster on 27 November 1956. Two men stole jewellery and money.

On 6 January 1958, she appeared as Roy Plomley's guest on the BBC Radio programme Desert Island Discs. Her choices were wide-ranging, including Bach, Mahler and Lena Horne. She was the head of the jury at the 13th Berlin International Film Festival in 1963.

Among the many charities supported by Toye were the Theatrical Guild (formerly the Theatrical Ladies' Guild), where she helped backstage and front-of-house staff, and became president, and the Actors' Charitable Trust, to which she was recruited by Noël Coward, and of which she was vice president.

Toye married Edward Selwyn Sharp in 1940; they divorced in 1950.

Toye collaborated with the cartoonist and illustrator Ronald Searle on the stage play Wild Thyme (1955), and then on two films: On The Twelfth Day (1955) and The King’s Breakfast (1963). Searle designed the decor and costumes and painted the sets. Based on a poem by A A Milne, The King's Breakfast, with music by Ron Grainer, tells of a quest to find an appropriate spread for the royal bread. Initially sponsored by the British Butter Board, the film ended up having its premiere at Cannes. On its re-release in 2022, The Guardian descried it as "a half-hour banquet of uproarious slapstick, dance and mime, with pantomime sets and costumes".

She was awarded the Silver Jubilee Medal in 1977, and appointed a Commander of the Order of the British Empire (CBE) in 1992 for services to the arts. She was made an honorary D. Litt. in 1996 by the City University. Toye was the subject of This Is Your Life in 1991, when she was surprised by Michael Aspel at the Alexandra Theatre, Birmingham.

She died on 27 February 2010 at Hillingdon Hospital, Greater London.

She refused to write or authorise a biography during her lifetime, in spite of encouragement by her friends and family. Her theatrical archive is mostly in the Wendy Toye Archive, V&A Theatre & Performance Department, THM/343 of the Victoria and Albert Museum, with some items in the University of Bristol Theatre Collection.

Selected work
This list is a collation from three biographical dictionaries, an obituary and the information web sites from some of the theatres.

Early career
 Produced a ballet on the colours of the rainbow at the London Palladium when aged 10, 1927–28
 First professional appearance: Moth in A Midsummer Night's Dream, Old Vic, April 1930
 Winner, European Championship Solo Amateur competition at C. B. Cochrane's Charleston Ball at the Albert Hall, 1926

Dancer, choreographer and actress
 choreographer Mother Earth (Savoy), 1929
 Marigold (later Phoebe) & produced dances Toad of Toad Hall, 1931–32
 danced and choreographed for Camargo Society, Sadler's Wells Ballet, Rambert, British Ballet, 1930s (early)
 Danced in The Miracle (Lyceum Theatre), 1932
 Masked Dancer in Ballerina (Gaiety Theatre), 1933
 Member of Ninette de Valois' original Vic-Wells ballet, principal dancer in The Golden Toy (Coliseum), 1934
 Toured with Anton Dolin's Ballet, 1934-1935
 Dancer in Tulip Time (Alhambra), 1935
 Touring as principal dancer and choreographer with Markova-Dolin Ballet, 1935
 Love and How to Cure It (Globe), 1937
 Choreographer for George Black's productions (including Black and Blue, Black Velvet, Black Vanities, Strike a New Note, Strike it Again), 1937–44
 Gay Rosalinda (Palace Theatre), 1945-1948
 Follow the Girls, 1945
 Principal Girl in pantomime Simple Simon (Birmingham), 1947
 Winnie Tate in Annie Get your Gun (London Coliseum), 1947
 Ballet-hoo de Wendy Toye (Paris), 1948
 Three's Company in Joyce Grenfell Requests the Pleasure (Fortune) (choreography), 1954

Stage director

London
 Big Ben, Bless the Bride, Tough at the Top (Adelphi for C.B. Cochrane), 1946
 And So to Bed (New), 1951
 Second Threshold (Vaudeville), 1950s???
 Wild Thyme (Duke of York's), 1955
 Lady at the Wheel (Lyric, Hammersmith), 1958
 As You Like It (Old Vic), 1959
 Majority of One (Phoenix), 1960
 Virtue in Danger (Mermaid and Strand), 1963
 Robert & Elizabeth (Lyric), 1964
 On the Level (Saville), 1966
 Show Boat (Adelphi), 1971
 She Stoops to Conquer (Young Vic), 1972
 Soldiers Tale (Young Vic & Edinburgh Festival), 1967
 The Great Waltz (Drury Lane), 1970
 Cowardy Custard (Mermaid), 1972
 Stand and Deliver (Roundhouse), 1972
 The Englishman Amused (Young Vic), 1974
 Follow the Star (Westminster). 1976
 Oh Mr. Porter (Mermaid), 1977
 Colette (Comedy), 1980
 This Thing Called Love (Ambassadors), 1984
 Barnum (Victoria Palace) (assoc producer) 1985
 Singin' in the Rain (London Palladium) (assoc producer), 1983
 Get the Message (Molecule), 1987
 Ziegfeld (London Palladium), 1988
 Family and Friends (Sadler's Wells), 1988
 Till We Meet Again concert (Royal Festival Hall), 1989
 Captain Beaky's Heavens Up (Palace), 1990
 The Sound of Music (Sadler's Wells), 1992
 Under Their Hats (King's Head), 1994
 Gala (last night of old Sadler's Wells Theatre), 1996

Chichester Festival
 R loves J, 1973
 The Confederacy, 1974
 Follow the Star, 1974
 Made in Heaven, 1975
 Make Me a World, 1976
 Miranda, 1987

Watermill Theatre, Newbury
 Gingerbread Man, 1981
 Songbook, 1988
 Moll Flanders, 1990
 The Drummer, 1991
 See How They Run, 1992
 The Anastasia File, 1994
 Lloyd George Knew My Father, 1995
 Warts and All, Rogues to Riches, 1996
 30 Not Out, 1997

Other UK
 Boots with Strawberry Jam (Nottingham Playhouse), 1968
 Once More with Music (Theatre Royal, Brighton), 1976
 Barnum (Manchester Opera House) (assoc producer), 1984
 Laburnum Grove (Watford Palace), 1987
 Mrs. Dot (Watford Palace), 1988
 Cinderella (Watford Palace), 1989
 Penny Black (Wavendon), 1990
 Mrs. Pat's Profession (workshop with Cleo Laine), 1991

Unknown location
 Dance for Gods, Conversations (??Stephenville), 1979
 Gala tribute to Joyce Grenfell, 1985

International
 Feu d'artifice, Marigny Theatre, Paris (co-director and choreographer), date unknown
 Peter Pan, (Imperial, New York) (co-director and choreographer) 1950
 Shakespeare Quatercentenary Latin American tour, 1964
 Noel and Gertie (Princess Grace Theatre Monte Carlo), 1984
 Celimar  (Shaw Festival, Niagara-on-the-Lake, Canada), 1984
 Madwoman of Chaillot (Shaw Festival, Niagara-on-the-Lake, Canada), 1985
 Torville & Dean Ice Show World Tour (assoc producer), 1985
 Kiss Me Kate  (Aarhus & Copenhagen), 1986
 Unholy Trinity (Stephenville Festival), 1986
 When That I Was (Manitoba Theater Center), 1988
 Oh! Coward (Playhouse Hong Kong), 1989
 The Kingfisher (Vienna English Theatre), 1993
 The Sound of Music (Vienna English Theatre), 1993
 Under Their Hats (Vienna English Theatre), 1995

Operas
 The Seraglio (Bath Festival), 1967
 The Impresario, Don Pasquale (Phoenix Opera), 1968
 The Mikado (Ankara), 1982
 Der Apotheker, la Serva Padrona (Aix-en-Provence festival), 1991

Sadler's Wells Opera/ENO
 Bluebeard's Castle, 1957
 The Telephone, 1957
 Russalka, 1959
 Die Fledermaus, 1959
 Orpheus in the Underworld, 1960
 La Vie Parisienne, 1961
 The Italian Girl in Algiers, 1968

ENO North
 La Cenerentola, The Merry Widow, 1979
 Orpheus in the Underworld, 1981

TV
 Esmi Divided, 1957
 Cliff in Scotland, c. 1965
 Girls Wanted – Istanbul, (BAFTA nomination) 1969
 Trial by Jury, 1982
 Tales of the Unexpected 1982

Films
Actress
 Dance Pretty Lady (1931)
 Invitation to the Waltz (1935)

Director
 The Stranger Left No Card (1952)
 The Teckman Mystery (1954)
 On the Twelfth Day... (1955)
 Raising a Riot (1955)
 All for Mary (1955)
 Three Cases of Murder (1955)
 True as a Turtle (1957)
 We Joined the Navy (1962)
 The King's Breakfast (1963)

References

External links

University of Bristol Theatre Collection
 The King's Breakfast (1963)

1917 births
2010 deaths
20th-century English actresses
Commanders of the Order of the British Empire
English ballerinas
English choreographers
English film actresses
English women film directors
Actresses from London
English theatre directors
British opera directors
Female opera directors
Film directors from London
Musicians from London